Owala Stream is a river in Ifon Osun, Osun State, Nigeria, near Ilie town. The river covers about 7 km2 can be converted to Dams and well as Irrigation because of good proportion of soil particles and fertile soil surrounded the River.

References 

Rivers of Nigeria